Theodor Berkelmann (17 April 1894 – 28 December 1943) was a German SS functionary during the Nazi era who served as the Higher SS and Police Leader in Saarland and Moselle during World War II.

Biography 
Theodor Berkelmann was born in Le Ban-Saint-Martin near Metz, in Alsace-Lorraine, which was then part of Germany.  During the First World War, he served in the German Army. Berkelmann served as a soldier, before being promoted to officer. He was awarded the Iron Cross Ist class.

By 1936, Berkelmann was promoted to SS-Gruppenführer. At the beginning of the Second World War, Berkelmann was appointed Higher SS and Police Leader in Saarland and Moselle. In 1942, he was promoted to the grade of "SS-Obergruppenführer". Berkelmann died of a brain tumor in Poznań, in 1943.

References

Sources 
 (de) Ruth Bettina Birn: Die Höheren SS- und Polizeiführer. Himmlers Vertreter im Reich und in den besetzten Gebieten. Droste Verlag, Düsseldorf, 1986.
 (de) Joachim Lilla : Statisten in Uniform. Die Mitglieder des Reichstags 1933-1945, Droste, Düsseldorf 2004.
 (de) Erich Stockhorst: 5000 Köpfe - Wer war was im Dritten Reich, Kiel 2000.
 (de) Klaus D. Patzwall (Hg.): Das Goldene Parteiabzeichen und seine Verleihungen ehrenhalber 1934 -1944, Verlag Klaus D. Patzwall, Norderstedt 2004.

External links 
 (de) Theo Berkelmann at Saarländische Biografien 
 (de) Datenbank der deutschen Parlamentsabgeordneten

1894 births
1943 deaths
People from Alsace-Lorraine
Military personnel from Metz
Members of the Reichstag of Nazi Germany
SS and Police Leaders
Prussian Army personnel
Recipients of the Iron Cross (1914), 1st class
20th-century Freikorps personnel
Deaths from brain cancer in Poland
Waffen-SS personnel
SS-Obergruppenführer
German Army personnel of World War I